Anonébéré is a small town in Abanga-Bigne Department, Moyen-Ogooué Province, in northwestern Gabon. It lies south of Kango and to the west of the town the north-south  N1 road connects with the N2 road. It stands on the Ogooue River.

References
Maplandia World Gazetteer

Populated places in Moyen-Ogooué Province
Abanga-Bigne Department